The 3rd Combat Weather Squadron (3 CWS) is a unit of the United States Air Force.  It was formed at Barksdale Field (now Barksdale Air Force Base), Louisiana, on 24 June 1937, as part of the Signal Corps. The 3rd was one of three original squadrons that eventually transferred from the Signal Corps to the Air Corps. Currently located at West Fort Hood, the 3rd Combat Weather Squadron is aligned under the 3rd Air Support Operations Group. Weather support to Fort Hood began in 1947 at the newly constructed Killeen AFB. Today, the 3rd Combat Weather Squadron—in addition to providing weather support to the Fort Hood complex—has operating locations at Forts Bliss, Huachuca, Riley, and Sill in Texas, Arizona, Kansas, and Oklahoma, respectively.

The 3rd Combat Weather Squadron is currently the largest base- or post-level weather unit in the Air Force. The support provided by the squadron is as diverse as its history and that of the Army customers it supports. The squadron maintains a 24-hour observing and forecasting section at Robert Gray Army Airfield with extended observing hours at Hood Army Airfield.

The squadron patch is Walt Disney's Cupid which was sold to the unit for one US dollar during World War II, in efforts to raise troop morale.

Combat Weather Teams
There are five Combat Weather Teams (CWTs) that support the following Army units at Fort Hood:
 III Corps. 
 1st Cavalry Division. 
 1st Cavalry Aviation Brigade. 
 4th Infantry Division (Mechanized). 
 4th Infantry Aviation Brigade.

Operations in Iraq
On 13 December 2003, 4ID combat weather forecasters produced planning and mission execution forecasts for Operation Red Dawn, which led to successful capture of Saddam Hussein.

See also
List of United States Air Force weather squadrons

References
This article contains information that originally came from Military Intelligence Bulletin, in the public domain from https://fas.org/irp/agency/army/tradoc/usaic/mipb/1997-4/MSGkooyman.htm

Weather 0003
Military units and formations established in 1937